Government Fatima Jinnah College for Women is an autonomous women college in Chuna Mandi, Lahore, Punjab. Before establishment of the college, it was a haveli and was known as Dhyan Singh Haveli, or Asif Jah Haveli.

History
The building of the college is four-hundred years old and was built by Abu'l-Hasan Asaf Khan. It was also used by Dhian Singh, a wazir of the Sikh Empire. When British tookover, the building was used as the office of assistant commissioner.

In 1864, the haveli was used by the Government College, Lahore and the Oriental College, Lahore for the preliminary classes. In 1871, the Government College, Lahore was shifted to a new building and the haveli was converted into Dhiyan Singh School which was renamed in 1947 as City Muslim League High School.

In 1986, it was converted into a college named after Fatima Jinnah, Government Fatima Jinnah College for Women, by Nawaz Sharif.

References

External links
 Official website

Universities and colleges in Lahore
Women's universities and colleges in Pakistan